Huang Daozhou (1585–1646) was a Chinese calligrapher, scholar and official of the Ming dynasty.

Huang obtained the degree of Jinshi in 1622. He subsequently held various government positions, including Minister for Education. He was known for providing candid advice to the emperors. This made him very unpopular with the Chongzhen Emperor. As a result, Huang was demoted and sent to prison.

In his later years, he volunteered to fight against the Manchurian invasion. He was captured and, refusing to surrender, was killed by the Manchurian army.

References
Huang Daozhou Brief Biography

Ming dynasty calligraphers
1585 births
1646 deaths
Ming dynasty politicians
Ming dynasty generals
Grand Secretaries of the Ming dynasty
Artists from Fujian
Politicians from Zhangzhou
Executed Ming dynasty people
People executed by the Qing dynasty by decapitation
Executed people from Fujian
Generals from Fujian
17th-century Chinese calligraphers
Deified Chinese people